Sir Robert Surtees Napier, 5th Baronet of Merrion Square, (5 March 1932 – 2 July 1994), was a British baronet and soldier.

He married Jenifer Beryl Daw on 12 February 1931.

He succeeded to the Baronetage of Merrion Square in 1986 on the death of his father Sir Joseph William Lennox Napier, 4th Baronet (1895–1986), and was succeeded by his son Sir Charles Joseph Napier, 6th Baronet in 1994.

References

External links
 http://thepeerage.com/p30835.htm#i308350

Baronets in the Baronetage of the United Kingdom
1932 births
1994 deaths